Big Black River may refer to

 Big Black River (Saint John River tributary) (French: Grande Rivière Noire)
 Big Black River (Mississippi)

See also
 Little Black River (disambiguation)
 Black River (disambiguation)
 Noire River (disambiguation)